Tatra National Park is the name for two different national parks located in the Tatra mountains:
Tatra National Park, Poland (Tatrzański Park Narodowy)
Tatra National Park, Slovakia (Tatranský národný park)